Owj-e Bala (also Romanized as Owj-e Bālā) is a village in Sedeh Rural District, Sedeh District, Qaen County, South Khorasan Province, Iran. At the 2006 census, its population was 11, in 5 families.

References 

Populated places in Qaen County